Søholm may refer to:

 Søholm, a locality in Fredensborg Municipality
 Søholm (country house), a historical building in Hellerup, Denmark, headquarter to Bjørn Thorsen A/S
 Søholm Row Houses, row houses in Klampenborg, Denmark
 Søholm, estate in Assens Municipality, Denmark
 Søholm, estate in Stevns Municipality, Denmark
 Søholm Keramik, ceramic manufactury on Bornholm, Denmark